Shangzhou may refer to:

Shangzhou District, a district of Shangluo, Shaanxi, China
Shangzhou Town, a town in Yibin County, Sichuan, China
Shang Prefecture, a historical prefecture in modern Shaanxi, China

See also
King Zhou of Shang (1105 BC – 1046 BC), king of Shang dynasty, sometimes written as "Shang Zhou"
Shang (disambiguation)